Eupoinae is a subfamily of jumping spiders (family Salticidae). It was created in 2015 by Wayne Maddison. The subfamily has three genera.

Genera
, the subfamily included three genera:
 Corusca Zhou & Li, 2013
 Eupoa Żabka, 1985
 Sinoinsula Zhou & Li, 2013

References

Salticidae
Spider subfamilies